The Guild Guitar Company is a United States-based guitar manufacturer founded in 1952 by Alfred Dronge, a guitarist and music-store owner, and George Mann, a former executive with the Epiphone Guitar Company. The brand name currently exists as a brand under Córdoba Music Group.

Origin

The first Guild workshop was located in Manhattan, New York, where Dronge (who soon took over full ownership) focused on electric and acoustic archtop jazz guitars. Much of the initial workforce consisted of former Epiphone workers who lost their jobs following their 1951 strike and the subsequent relocation of the company from Queens to Philadelphia. Rapid expansion forced the company to move to much larger quarters, on Newark St. in Hoboken, New Jersey, in the old R. Neumann Leathers building. The advent of the folk music craze in the early 1960s had shifted the company into production of an important line of acoustic folk and blues guitars, including a dreadnought series (D-40, D-50 and, later, D-55) that competed successfully with Martin's D-18 and D-28 models, and jumbo and Grand Concert "F" models that were particularly popular with blues guitarists such as Dave Van Ronk. Notable also was the Guild 12-string guitar, which used a Jumbo "F" body and dual truss rods in the neck to produce a workhorse instrument with a deep, rich tone distinctive from the chimier twelve-strings put out by Martin.

The company continued to expand, and was sold to the Avnet Corporation, which moved production to Westerly, Rhode Island, in 1966. As the folk scene quieted, a new generation of folk-rockers took Guild guitars on stage. The most notable Guild performance of that era was on the D-40 that Richie Havens played when he opened Woodstock in 1969.

During the 1960s, Guild moved aggressively into the electric guitar market, successfully promoting the Starfire line of semi-acoustic (Starfire I, II and III) and semi-solid (Starfire IV, V and VI) guitars and basses. A number of early West-Coast psychedelic bands used these instruments, notably guitarists Bob Weir and Jerry Garcia and bassist Phil Lesh of the Grateful Dead, as well as Jefferson Airplane's bassist Jack Casady. Instrument maker Alembic started their transition from sound and recording work to instrument building by modifying Lesh & Casady's Starfire basses. The rare S-200 Thunderbird solid body electric was used by Muddy Waters and The Lovin' Spoonful's Zal Yanovsky. Inspired by seeing Muddy Waters, Ross Hannaford acquired a Thunderbird, which he used extensively in the period that he played in popular Australian 1970s band Daddy Cool.

Guild also successfully manufactured the first dreadnought acoustic guitar with a "cut-away" in its lower shoulder to allow better access to the upper frets, the D40-C.  In 1972, under Guild's new president Leon Tell, noteworthy guitarist/designer Richard "Rick" Excellente came up with the design. It is still made, copied by virtually every guitar manufacturer.

The decline of the folk and acoustic market in the later 1970s and early 1980s put severe economic pressure on the company. While instrument specialists generally concede that quality suffered at other American competitors, Guild models from the 1970s and 1980s are considered still made to the high-quality standards the Westerly plant was known for. In the 1980s, Guild introduced a series of Superstrat solid bodies including models such as the Flyer, Aviator, Liberator and Detonator, the Tele-style T-200 and T-250 (endorsed by Roy Buchanan) and the Pilot Bass, available in fretted, fretless, and 4- and 5-string versions. These guitars were the first Guild instruments to bear slim pointed headstocks, sometimes called "pointy droopy", "duck foot" and "cake knife" for their distinctive shape.

Fender era

After several changes in management and ownership, Guild was eventually purchased by the Fender Musical Instruments Corporation in 1995. In late 2001, Fender decided to shut down the Westerly, RI factory (citing difficulty in climate control and factory production workflow as primary motives) and moved all Guild production to its factory in Corona, California. To ease the Corona facility (which had only made electric guitars up to this point) into making archtop and acoustic guitars, the Westerly factory artisans and workers prepared guitar 'kits' that they shipped to Corona. These kits were near-complete production guitars that only needed finishing and final assembly before being sent to retailers.

Production in Corona was short-lived, however, as Fender acquired the assets of Washington-based Tacoma Guitar Company in 2004, and moved all American Guild acoustic guitar production to Tacoma, Washington and discontinued production of US-made Guild electric guitars completely.

In 2008, Fender again moved Guild when it acquired Kaman Music Corporation and its small production facility in New Hartford, Connecticut, where hand production of all US-made Guilds resumed in a manner consistent with other high-end, boutique guitar builders. The New Hartford Guild facility began production in early 2009, starting with the top-end D-55 and F-50 models. Production quickly ramped up to include most of the popular Traditional Series acoustic guitar models. Acoustic-Electric versions of these models were also made available. Starting with 2012 models, all US-built Guild Traditional Series guitars were available in right- and left-handed configurations.

In 2011, Traditional Series models' were improved by means of a new DTAR pickup system (DTAR-MS, for 'multi-source'), which allows blending between an internal microphone element and an under-saddle transducer. Previous DTAR configurations only included an under-saddle transducer. Also, hard shell case material was upgraded to a high-end, faux alligator skin material with crushed velvet interior padding, closely resembling the Custom Shop guitar cases that Guild had used when its Custom Shop was open.

In late 2010, Guild released its Standard Series acoustic guitars, which were US-built guitars (still manufactured in the New Hartford, Connecticut facility) that were based on models from their top-end Traditional Series. Differences in ornamentation and instrument finish options made them more affordable. Standard Series models included the F-30, F-30R, F-50, D-40, D-50, and the return of the F-212XL 12-string model. All Standard Series models featured red spruce bracing, satin mahogany necks, and bone saddles, nuts, and bridge pins, but have nondescript grade wood and different ornamentation than their Traditional Series counterparts.

In 2011, cutaway acoustic-electric versions of all Standard Series models were released. These guitars featured venetian cutaways and a DTAR 18V under-saddle pickup system. These models can be identified by the 'CE' suffix at the end of the guitar's model number. 

The New Hartford facility had also created a new line of specialty, limited edition guitars, referred to as the GSR Series. The GSR designation stands for "Guild Special Run." This series was first revealed to Guild dealers at Guild's dealer-only factory tour in mid-2009 called the "Guild Summit Retreat". These models featured unique takes on classic Guild Traditional Series models. 
GSR models include the F-20 (figured Cocbolo), F-30R (master-grade Rosewood), F-40 (figured Cocobolo), F-50 (figured Koa), and D-50 (figured Cocobolo), and Guild's only electric guitar to be produced since 2003, the GSR Starfire VI (only 20 produced). Each of these instruments features unique designs, wood selection, ornamentation, and has extremely limited production numbers.

Cordoba era
In the late spring/early summer of 2014, Fender's New Hartford Guild facility closed its doors as FMIC prepared to sell off the Guild brand. Cordoba Music Group (CMG), based in Santa Monica, California, stepped in and purchased the Guild brand rights and began setting up a new manufacturing facility in Oxnard, California, led by Gibson alum Ren Ferguson as the VP of Manufacturing and R&D. Cordoba started production in late 2015, releasing its first models (M-20 and D-20) in early 2016. Higher-end models like the D-55 were released in late 2017.

Guild Import brands
In the early 1970s, Guild began to form import brands for acoustic and electric guitars made in Asia. There was a total of three import brands: Madeira, Burnside, and DeArmond.

Madeira Acoustic and Electric Guitars were import guitars based on existing Guild designs. They are characterized by their substantially unique pickguard shape and differing headstock.

Similarly to Madeira, Burnside Electric Guitars were Guild electric guitar designs (typically of super-Strat delineation) manufactured outside the United States. The headstocks on these guitars read "Burnside by Guild." Both brands were discontinued in the early 1990s.

After Fender purchased Guild in the mid 1990s, reissues of some Guild electric guitars were manufactured in Korea under the DeArmond brand name, which Fender also owned the rights to. Import reissue models included the Starfire, X155, T400, M-75 Bluesbird, S-73, and Pilot Bass series. On the front of the headstock, these instruments display the DeArmond logo above a modified version of Guild's Chesterfield logo. On early production versions, the truss rod cover is stenciled with the word 'Guild' stylized and the DeArmond reissue model number, and the back of the headstock is stenciled with 'DeArmond by Guild' above the guitar's serial number. Later production versions drop all references to the Guild brand name except for a modified Chesterfield headstock inlay on most models. The DeArmond line also included other less expensive models similar in design to the Guild reissues and manufactured in Indonesia. The DeArmond brand was discontinued in the early 2000s.

While not a discrete brand, in the early 2000s, FMIC created a new line of Guild acoustic guitars called the GAD-series, which stood for "Guild Acoustic Design." As with the other import lines, these guitars were based on past and present Guild acoustic guitar designs, but were built in China. All of these models were designated with a 'GAD' as a model prefix. These guitars featured poly finishes (as opposed to traditional nitrocellulose lacquer on US models) and nondescript wood grading. FMIC did not choose to create this line under a different brand name, but left it as a new series of guitars from Guild. This choice caused confusion for buyers, as it marked the first time that an import had actually donned the Guild brand name, which had previously only been used to describe US-made guitars. Because of this, it was no longer immediately clear if a Guild-branded guitar is a US-made model or an import, although the GAD models usually had unique ornamentation.

The 2011 GAD models brought new features, looks, and model numbers. These new GAD-series Guild guitars could be identified with a number 1 as the first number in the model number. For example, a US-built F-50R's GAD-level version would be called an F-150R. Similarly, a US-built F-512 would be an F-1512 as a GAD version.

With Cordoba taking over as owners of the Guild brand, as of May, 2015, the GAD line-up was discontinued, but two newly formed lines, Westerly Collection (acoustics) and Newark Street (electrics) were revealed, which also aimed to pay homage Guild's production history that took place at those locations (with the Newark Street address alluding to a link with the Hoboken factory). The Westerly Collection line-up includes a variety of guitars made with solid wood tops/laminate sides and body; and, solid wood tops/solid wood sides and solid wood backs.

Notable users of Guild guitars

 Bryan Adams – F-50R
 Ryan Adams – D-25M
 Billie Joe Armstrong – D-55
 Ron Asheton - Jetstar
 Dan Auerbach – Thunderbird S-200
 Elek Bacsik – Stuart X-500 + Charlie Christian style single coil pickup
 Joan Baez – F30R
 Ehud Banai – D-55
 George Barnes (musician) – George Barnes Acousti-Lectric, George Barnes Guitar in F
 Richard Barone – X-500 (Cool Blue Halo album)
 Brendan Benson – 1959 Aristocrat
 George Benson – 
 A.A. Bondy – T-100D (slim jim)
 Paul Bonin – F65CE
 Zeta Bosio – Guild Pilot Bass
 Greg Brown – Starfire III
 Creed Bratton – Bluesbird
 Roy Buchanan – T-200 and T-250
 Tim Buckley 
 Jeff Buckley – 1967 Guild F-50
 Charlie Byrd – Mark VI
 David Byrne - F15CE
 Mya Byrne – F20, F30, D35
 Larry Carlton – Bluesbird
 Stephen Carpenter
 Jack Casady – Starfire bass
 Peter Calo - JC30
 Ken Macy - GAD40CE
 Eva Cassidy 
 Jerry Cantrell – JF55 - MTV Unplugged
 Gustavo Cerati – Guild F4CE
 Peter Cetera – F612
 Eric Clapton – F-30, GF-60, S4CE/Songbird
 Fred Cole – S-200 Thunderbird
 Judy Collins – F312
 Sheryl Crow – M-85 bass, B-301 bass
 Kayla Daly - JF30
 Rick Danko – F-50
 Dave Davies – DE-500, Starfire III, F-512 NT 12-string
 John Denver – F-50R, F-212XL and F-612 (custom)
 Lonnie Donegan - F-512
 Doyle Dykes
 Duane Eddy
 David James Elliott as Cmdr. Harmon Rabb Jr. – D-50CE (special edition sunburst)
 Brian Erickson – 1983 D-25
 Duke Erikson – Starfire III
 Nick Falcon – X-170 Manhattan
 Leslie Feist – 1965 Starfire IV
 The Felice Brothers – T100D (SLIM JIM) and Guild D4 acoustic
 Tom Fogerty – Starfire
 James Blackshaw – various Guild 12-string models
 Justin Furstenfeld
 Jerry Garcia – Starfire III
 Yonatan Gat – Thunderbird S200
 Barry Gibb – Songbird BG (stands for Barry Gibb) and X-375 
 Charlie Gracie
 Ted Greene
 Colin Greenwood
 Dave Gonzalez – X-550 Paladin
 Steve Gunn
 Andy Hackett – 1967 Starfire VI and 1964 Thunderbird S200
 Mary Halvorson - X500 Archtop 
 Peter Hammill - M75 Bluesbird named Meurglys III
 Steve Harley - JF-55 Sunburst (rarely used on stage).
 Mick Harvey – Starfire IV
 Richie Havens
 Hayden – Starfire III, CE-100D
 Justin Hayward – JF-65
 John Herman – B-302 Bass
 Hank Hill – 1963 Solid Top
 Chris Hillman – Starfire Bass
 Roger Hodgson – F-412 and F-512
 Susanna Hoffs – Starfire XII
 Lightnin' Hopkins – Starfire IV
 Shannon Hoon – JF-30
 Sivert Høyem – F-512 12-string
 Ian Hunter – S-100
 Mississippi John Hurt – F-30
 Glenn Jones (guitarist) – D-50, F-512 12-String
 Barney Kessel
 Tim Kinsella – Guild S-100 (1970s Acorn Leaf)
 Aidan Knight Guild T100 + Guild M-65 Freshman
 Mark Knopfler – Songbird
 Nikki Lane - M20
 Phil Lesh – Starfire bass
 Gary Lightbody
 Lera Lynn – Starfire III, T-50
 Ken Macy - GAD40CE
 Scott Matthews
 Bryn Merrick - Guild B302 Bass
 Dan Navarro - 1986 GF50NT, 1976 F112, GAD-120
 A.C. Newman
 Krist Novoselic - Guild B30E Semi Acoustic Bass - (MTV Unplugged in New York)
 Joe Nichols
 Kristian Matsson
Brian May - F512  
 John Mayer Where The Light Is – Trio Set
 Barry McGuire – F-212 12-string
 Ellen McIlwaine – S-250, S-500-D
 Pat Metheny – D40-C, F-50
 Lindsay Mitchell - Nightbird X-500 Starfire III
 Matt "Guitar" Murphy
 Michael Nesmith – JF-30
 Pelle Ossler – Starfire
 Jeff McDonald – Thunderbird 
 Nathen Page – Starfire IV SN EL135
 Steven Page
 Charlie Parr
 Tom Petty – D25-12
 Jesse Quin – Starfire
 John Renbourn – D-55 (ca. 1975-85) 
 Josh Ritter
 Duke Robillard
 Daniel Rossen – T-50
 Arlen Roth
 John Rzeznik – Many D-55s, F65CE, F47M Valencia, S7CE Custom, S4CE, DV-52, and more, mostly during the late Westerly and early Corona eras.
 Son Seals – Starfire IV
 Chris Seefried – Guild Starfire, Guild D 212
 Randall Shawver – Guild X-88 Flying Star
 Carly Simon - F212 12 string
 Paul Simon – F-30 and F-212 12-string
 Megan Slankard – D-55
 Claydes Charles Smith – X-350
 Johnny Smith
 Robert Smith - Custom Ebony JF-30 12string
 Steven R. Smith – Starfire III
 Tommy Smothers – D-55 (TV model)
 Les Spann
 Bruce Springsteen – D-40SB
 Stephen Stills – X-500
 George Strait – Custom Shop D-100
 Sofia Talvik – 1984 D-25
 Kim Thayil – Guild S-100
 Peter Tork – Jetstar Bass
 Ralph Towner – F-212C and F-512 
 Pete Townshend – F-512 NT 
 Dave Van Ronk – F-50R
 Steve Van Zandt – X-79 (zebra pattern)
 Stevie Ray Vaughan – JF-65 12-string
 Suzanne Vega in mid-1980s
 Tom Waits
 Joe Walsh – 
 Muddy Waters – S-200 Thunderbird
 Bob Weir – Starfire V, F50r
 Gillian Welch – D-25M
 Bert Weedon – Starfire (signature model - early 1960s)
 Paul Weller – Guild F47mce
 Paul Westerberg
 Josh White
 Hank Williams III – G37 Sunburst
 Zal Yanovsky – S-200 Thunderbird
 Dan Zanes - F30, F212 12 string
 Zach Bryan

 Buddy Guy
 Chris Ledoux - F-55

References

Bibliography

Hans Moust (1995) The Guild Guitar Book. Hal Leonard Corporation. Roger Hodgson - F-512, Ted Kaplan (aka Teddy Rose) - F212/F412xl

External links

 Official website
 Westerly Guild Guitars information on Westerly RI manufactured Guild models

Guitar manufacturing companies of the United States
Design companies established in 1952
Manufacturing companies based in California
Manufacturing companies established in 1952
1952 establishments in New York City